Kaio Jorge Pinto Ramos (born 24 January 2002), known as Kaio Jorge or simply Kaio, is a Brazilian professional footballer who plays as a striker for  club Juventus.

Club career

Santos
Born in Olinda, Pernambuco, Kaio joined Santos' under-11s in 2013. In November 2017, aged only 15, he was promoted to the under-20 squad.

On 21 September 2018, Kaio was promoted to the first-team by manager Cuca. He made his professional – and Série A – debut nine days later, coming on as a second-half substitute for Bruno Henrique in a 1–0 home defeat of Atlético Paranaense, becoming the sixth youngest to debut in Santos' history.

On 11 January 2019, after lengthy negotiations, Kaio signed his first professional contract with the club, agreeing to a three-year deal. He scored his first goal for Peixe on 3 March of the following year, netting his team's second in a 2–1 Copa Libertadores away win against Defensa y Justicia; it was also his debut match in the competition.

Juventus
On 26 July 2021, Kaio reportedly agreed to a pre-contract with Italian side Juventus, effective as of 1 January. On 2 August, Santos announced an agreement with Juventus for his immediate transfer, with the Italian side paying a rumoured fee of €3 million. Juventus officially announced Kaio's transfer on 17 August, signing him on a five-year contract.

On 23 August, Kaio suffered a medium-grade injury to the rectus femoris. On 1 September, Kaio was excluded from Juventus' 23-man squad for the UEFA Champions League group stage. He played his first match since this injury (and the first one for Juventus) on 2 October, in a 1–0 away win against cross-city rivals Torino, coming on as substitute in the 89th minute.

On 20 October, Kaio played a match with Juventus U23 — the reserve team of Juventus — in a 2–2 Serie C away draw against AlbinoLeffe, where he missed a penalty and scored a goal. In January 2022, Kaio refused a loan move to Sassuolo. On 2 February, Juventus' coach Massimiliano Allegri did not include Kaio in the UEFA Champions League knock-out stage squad. Kaio was called up by Juventus U23 again on 22 February, for a match against Pro Patria set to be played the following day, where he injured his patellar tendon. He ended the 2021–22 season early, having only played 125 minutes in nine matches with the first team (none as a starter).

International career
Kaio was called up to the Brazil U15 team for the 2017 South American U-15 Championship, scoring four goals in three matches during the tournament. On 21 September 2018, he was called up to the U17 team for a friendly tournament in Nantwich and Telford, England.

On 20 September 2019, Kaio was included in Guilherme Dalla Déa's 21-man list for the 2019 FIFA U-17 World Cup. He scored five goals in the competition, including one in the final (a 2–1 defeat of Mexico), and was awarded the Bronze Boot.

Personal life
Kaio's father Jorge Ramos was also a footballer and a forward who notably represented Chaves and Gama.

Career statistics

Honours
Brazil U17
 FIFA U-17 World Cup: 2019
Individual
 FIFA U-17 World Cup Bronze Boot: 2019

References

External links
 Juventus F.C. profile
 

2002 births
Living people
People from Olinda
Sportspeople from Pernambuco
Brazilian footballers
Association football forwards
Santos FC players
Juventus F.C. players
Juventus Next Gen players
Campeonato Brasileiro Série A players
Serie A players
Serie C players
Brazil youth international footballers
Brazilian expatriate footballers
Brazilian expatriate sportspeople in Italy
Expatriate footballers in Italy